Piazza dei Signori is a city square in Treviso, north-eastern Italy.

It takes its name (meaning "Lords Square" in Italian) from the palaces of lords the former seignory of Treviso which face it.  They include:

Palazzo del Podestà with the Civic tower (13th century), which was the lordship's seat
Palazzo dei Trecento
Palazzo Pretorio (with a 17th century façade)
Original seat of the Municipal Library and the Municipal Gallery (1847)

The Square also features several sculptures of Lion of Saint Mark, a symbol of the former domination of the Republic of Venice on Treviso.

Gallery

External links
Page at Trevisoinfo website 

Piazzas in Treviso